Parti Socialiste Unifié can refer to:

 Unified Socialist Party (Burkina Faso)
 Unified Socialist Party (France)
 Unified Socialist Party (Morocco)